Asela was an early monarch of Sri Lanka of the Kingdom of Anuradhapura, based at the ancient capital of Anuradhapura from 215 BC to 205 BC. He was the youngest of the many sons of Mutasiva and brother of previous monarchs Devanampiya Tissa, Uttiya and Mahasiva. Asela fought Sena and Guttika in a battle to re-establish Vijaya rule in 215 BC, but in 205 BC the kingdom of Anuradhapura was again invaded by a Tamil, a Prince of the Chola dynasty named Ellalan killing Asela.

See also
 List of Sri Lankan monarchs

External links 
 Kings & Rulers of Sri Lanka
 Codrington's Short History of Ceylon

Monarchs of Anuradhapura
3rd-century BC Sinhalese monarchs
 Sinhalese Buddhist monarchs
Year of birth unknown
205 BC deaths
A
A